Sgarbi is an Italian surname. Notable people with the surname include:

Abdon Sgarbi (1903–1929), Italian footballer
Alberto Sgarbi (born 1986), Italian rugby union player
Filippo Sgarbi (born 1997), Italian footballer
Vittorio Sgarbi (born 1952), Italian art critic and politician

Italian-language surnames